The Roman fort at Weissenburg, called Biriciana in ancient times, is a former Roman ala castellum, which is a UNESCO World Heritage Site located near the Upper Germanic-Rhaetian Limes. It lies in the borough of Weißenburg in the Middle Franconian county of Weißenburg-Gunzenhausen in Germany. Today the castellum is one of the most important sites of research in the Roman limes in Germany. The site contains partly subterranean building remains, a reconstructed north gateway, large thermal baths and a Roman Museum with an integrated Limes Information Centre.

Literature 
 Dietwulf Baatz: Der Römische Limes. Archäologische Ausflüge zwischen Rhein und Donau. 4th edn. Gebr. Mann, Berlin, 2000, pp. 289 ff.
 Wilhelm von Christ: Das römische Militärdiplom von Weissenburg. Franz, Munich, 1868.
 Wolfgang Czysz et al.: Die Römer in Bayern. Nikol, Hamburg 2005, 
 Thomas Fischer and Günter Ulbert: Der Limes in Bayern. Von Dinkelsbühl bis Eining. Theiss, Stuttgart, 1983, 
 Ernst Fabricius, Felix Hettner and Oscar von Sarwey (eds.): Der Obergermanisch-Raetische Limes des Römerreiches. Abt. A, Bd. 7, Strecke 14: Der raetische Limes von Gunzenhausen bis Kipfenberg. Berlin, 1927.
 Eveline Grönke: Das römische Alenkastell Biricianae in Weißenburg in Bayern. Die Grabungen von 1890 bis 1990. (Limesforschungen, Bd. 25). Zabern, Mainz, 1997, 
 Eveline Grönke, Edgar Weinlich: Die Nordfront des römischen Kastells Biriciana-Weissenburg: Die Ausgrabungen 1986/1987. Prähistorischen Staatssammlung München, Laßleben, Kallmünz, 1991. .
 Ute Jäger: Römisches Weißenburg. Kastell Biriciana, Große Thermen, Römermuseum. Keller, Treuchtlingen/Berlin, 2006, 
 Hans-Jörg Kellner: Der römische Schatzfund von Weißenburg. 3. erweiterte Auflage. Schnell & Steiner, Regensburg, 1997, 
 Hans-Jörg Kellner, Gisela Zahlhaas, mit Beiträgen von Hans-Gert Bachmann, Claus-Michael Hüssen, Harald Koschik, Zsolt Visy und Ulrich Zwicker: Der römische Tempelschatz von Weissenburg i. Bay., von Zabern, Mainz, 1993, .
 Martin Pietsch, Jörg Faßbinder, Ludwig Fuchs:  Mehr Tiefenschärfe durch Magnetik: Der neue Plan des Kastells Weißenburg. In: Das Archäologische Jahr in Bayern 2006. Stuttgart, 2007, pp. 98–101.
 W. Kohl, J. Tröltsch, J. Jacobs, W. Barthel and Ernst Fabricius: Der obergermanisch-raetische Limes des Roemerreiches. Abt. B, Bd. 7, Nr. 72: Kastell Weißenburg. Berlin, 1906.
 Johann Schrenk und Werner Mühlhäußer: Land am Limes. Auf den Spuren der Römer in der Region Hesselberg – Gunzenhausen – Weißenburg. Schrenk, Gunzenhausen, 2009, esp. pp. 107–114.
 Ludwig Wamser: Biriciana – Weißenburg zur Römerzeit. 2nd edn. Theiss, Stuttgart, 1986. (Guide to Archaeological Monuments in Bavaria: Franconia 1),

External links 

 Weißenburg Roman Fort on the website of the German Limes Commission
 Biriciana on the private project page by Bernd Liermann

References 

Weißenburg-Gunzenhausen
Heritage sites in Bavaria
Roman fortifications in Raetia
Roman auxiliary forts in Germany